The 1977 Men's South American Volleyball Championship, the 12th tournament, took place in 1977 in Lima.

Final positions

Mens South American Volleyball Championship, 1977
Volleyball Championships
Men's South American Volleyball Championships
1977 in South American sport
International volleyball competitions hosted by Peru